Franz Wende, also in Czech František Wende (3 June 1904 in Svoboda nad Úpou - 1968 in Bad Harzburg) was an ethnic German Czechoslovak ski jumper and nordic combined skier who has competed in the 1920s. He won two bronze medals at the FIS Nordic World Ski Championships in ski jumping (1925) and Nordic combined (1927). He also competed in the individual event at the 1924 Winter Olympics.

Wende and other three Ethnic German sportspeople, members of the Hauptverband Deutscher Wintersportvereine in der ČSR, represented Czechoslovakia at the first Winter Olympics in Chamonix.

References

External links
 . Ski jumping profile
 . Nordic combined profile
 
 

Czech male ski jumpers
Czech male Nordic combined skiers
Czechoslovak male ski jumpers
1904 births
1968 deaths
FIS Nordic World Ski Championships medalists in Nordic combined
FIS Nordic World Ski Championships medalists in ski jumping
Olympic ski jumpers of Czechoslovakia
Olympic Nordic combined skiers of Czechoslovakia
Ski jumpers at the 1924 Winter Olympics
Nordic combined skiers at the 1928 Winter Olympics
People from Trutnov District
Sudeten German people
Sportspeople from the Hradec Králové Region